An election to Letterkenny Town Council took place on 5 June 2004 as part of that year's Irish local elections. 9 councillors were elected by PR-STV voting for a five-year term of office.

Results by party

Results
 Sitting in italics

Elected
 Ciaran Brogan, Fianna Fáil
 Dessie Larkin, Independent Fianna Fáil
 Victor Fisher, Fianna Fáil
 Damien Blake, Fianna Fáil
 Jimmy Harte, Fine Gael
 Jim Lynch, Independent
 Gerry McMonagle, Sinn Féin
 Jean Crossan, Fianna Fáil
 Neil Clarke, Green Party

Excluded
 Jimmy Kavanagh, Fine Gael
 P. J. Blake, Independent
 Charlie McClafferty, Fine Gael
 Peter Patton, Independent
 Marian Metcalfe, Fine Gael
 Peter Cutliffe, Independent
 Khris Veldman, Progressive Democrats
 Patrick Gallagher, Fianna Fáil   
 Seán Reilly, Labour Party
 Francis McCafferty, Socialist Party

External links
 Letterkenny Town Council election, 2004 at electionsireland.org (archive link)

2004 Irish local elections
Politics of Letterkenny